The Cork-Mayo rivalry is a Gaelic football rivalry between Irish county teams Cork and Mayo, who first played each other in 1901. The fixture has been an infrequent one in the history of the championship, and therefore the rivalry is not as intense between the two teams. Cork's home ground is Páirc Uí Chaoimh and Mayo's home ground is MacHale Park, however, all of their championship meetings have been held at neutral venues, usually Croke Park.

While Cork have the second highest number of Munster  titles and Mayo are the standard bearers in Connact, they have also enjoyed success in the All-Ireland Senior Football Championship, having won 10 championship titles between them to date.

All-time results

Legend

Senior

References

Mayo
Mayo county football team rivalries